Shin Che-bon (born September 27, 1971) is a former South Korean football player.

Club statistics

References

External links

1971 births
Living people
Association football people from Tokyo
South Korean footballers
J1 League players
Japan Football League (1992–1998) players
Japan Football League players
JEF United Chiba players
Kawasaki Frontale players
Tokyo Musashino United FC players
Association football forwards